Black Leopards FC is a South African football club based in Thohoyandou, Vhembe Region, Limpopo that plays in the National First Division.

History
The club was founded in 1983 by business people in the Vhembe Region. In 1998 the club was taken over by the Thidiela family. After just two seasons of campaigning in the National First Division, Black Leopards FC was promoted to the ABSA Premier Soccer League.

In 2008 they were relegated back to the National First Division after playing for seven seasons in the Absa Premiership but the club made its return to the top tier division three years later.

Honours
First Division Inland Stream: 1
2000-01

National First Division promotion/relegation playoffs: 2
2010–11

2017–18

Club records
Most starts:  Christopher Netshidzivhe 163
Most goals:  Mulondo Sikhwivhilu 44
Most capped player:  Robert Ng'ambi
Most starts in a season:  Nkosiyabo Xakane 36 (2011–12)
Most goals in a season:  David Zulu 16 (2013–14) 
Record victory: 7–1 vs Bush Bucks (13/4/02), (PSL)
Record defeat: 0–5 vs Kaizer Chiefs (9/9/03), (PSL)

Premier Soccer League record

2001–02 – 8th
2002–03 – 11th
2003–04 – 8th
2004–05 – 14th
2005–06 – 12th
2006–07 – 11th
2007–08 – 15th (relegated)
2011–12 – 14th
2012–13 – 16th (relegated)
2018–19 – 13th
2019–20 – 15th
2020–21 – 16th (relegated)

Club officials/Technical team
 Coach:  Morgan Shivambu

First team squad

Shirt sponsor and kit manufacturer
Shirt sponsor: None
Kit manufacturer: Umbro

Notable former coaches

 Milo Bjelica (1999)
 Jacob Sakala
 Jan Simulambo (2000)
 Gavin Hunt (July 2001 – 2 June)
 Arnaldo Salvado (2002)
 Walter Rautmann (2003)
 Ephraim Mashaba (Feb 2004 – 5 March)
 Jean-Yves Kerjean (2005)
 Boebie Solomons (April 2006 – 8 March)
 Bibey Mutombo (July 2006 – 6 Oct)
 Mlungisi Ngubane (Nov 2006 – 7 Jan)
 Hans-Dieter Schmidt (Jan 2007 – 7 June)
 Joel Masutha (interim) (March 2008)
 Augustine Eguavoen (March 2008)
 Sheppard Murape (March 2008 – 8 June)
 Joel Masutha (June 2008 – 9 June)
 Mario Marinica (June 2009 – 10 June)
 Vladislav Heric (2009–10)
 Sunday Chidzambwa (Oct 2010 – 11 Oct)
 Vladislav Heric (Oct 2011 – 12 May)
 Sunday Chidzambwa (May 2012 – 12 Oct)
 Ian Palmer (Oct 2012 – 12 Dec)
 Abel Makhubela (interim) (Jan 2013–)
 Kostadin Papic ( August 2013 – May 2014)
 Zeca Marques (June 2014–20xx)
 Jean-Francois Losciuto (−2017)
 Ivan Minnaert (2017)
 Cavin Johnson (2019–2020)

References

External links
 

 
Association football clubs established in 1983
Premier Soccer League clubs
Soccer clubs in Limpopo
National First Division clubs
1983 establishments in South Africa
Polokwane